Kanaji Dam  is a gravity dam located in Hyogo Prefecture in Japan. The dam is used for flood control. The catchment area of the dam is 11.5 km2. The dam impounds about 22  ha of land when full and can store 4700 thousand cubic meters of water. The construction of the dam was started on 1986 and completed in 2015.

See also
List of dams in Japan

References

Dams in Hyogo Prefecture